The United Sabah Party (abbreviated PBS) is a political party of Sabah. The PBS was founded by Joseph Pairin Kitingan in 1985 and it is Sabah's oldest local party. In August 2020, PBS confirmed that they would be using their own logo and flag until Sabah's local coalition is established under Registrar of Societies (RoS). In 2022, Gabungan Rakyat Sabah (GRS) is the only Sabah's local coalition that has been successfully registered under the Registrar of Societies (RoS) making PBS interested in using the coalition's logo and becoming part of the coalition's component.

Since 2022, the PBS acts as an allied partner, providing confidence and supply to the ruling federal Pakatan Harapan (PH) coalition. It is a major component of the Sabah-based Gabungan Rakyat Sabah (GRS) state governing alliance.

History
PBS was registered as a political party on 5 March 1985. Its founding President is Joseph Pairin Kitingan who had broken away from the ruling Parti Bersatu Rakyat Jelata Sabah (BERJAYA) because of his differences with the Chief Minister of Sabah and party president, Harris Salleh in whose state cabinet Pairin served before the break-up. BERJAYA itself had ousted the previous state government of United Sabah National Organisation (USNO) to govern Sabah for 8 years from 1976 to 1985.

PBS later formed the state government after winning the May 1985 state elections. Following the 1986 Sabah riots after winning the 1986 state election, PBS joined the Barisan Nasional (BN) coalition and governed Sabah from 1985 to 1994. However, on the eve of the July 1990 state elections, PBS pulled out of the BN to join the Gagasan Rakyat (GR) coalition and won the state election for a third time. It also won the 1994 state elections by a narrow margin. However, numerous defections occurred as many PBS representatives switched allegiance to the then opposition BN coalition before PBS was even able to form a new state government. PBS subsequently rejoined the BN coalition in 2002, ending any form of opposition as BN fully occupied the state legislature and returning Sabah to the rule of the BN coalition that also holds the federal parliament.

Following the fall of both federal and state BN governments in the 2018 general election (GE14), PBS left the coalition and formed a new Sabah-based informal coalition of parties known as the United Alliance (Sabah) or Gabungan Bersatu (Sabah) and also the succeeding United Sabah Alliance or Gabungan Sabah Bersatu. During the 2020–21 Malaysian political crisis later, PBS has become allied partner providing confidence and supply to the new ruling federal government Perikatan Nasional (PN) coalition set-up by prime minister Muhyiddin Yassin. On 12 September 2020, PBS joined the (also Muhyiddin formed) Gabungan Rakyat Sabah (GRS) or Sabah People's Alliance just before the 2020 Sabah state election which was won eventually by the GRS to form the state government. As a result, PBS has signed the Memorandum of Understanding (MoU) of both the PN and GRS pacts separately. However, PBS expressed that they will stick to their own logo and flag until the actual local coalition is established under the RoS in the next and subsequent elections.

In 2022, Gabungan Rakyat Sabah (GRS) is the only coalition that has been successfully registered under the Registrar of Societies (RoS) making PBS interested in using the coalition's logo and becoming part of the coalition's component.

Ideology and support base
Although it is mainly seen as an ethnically-based Kadazan-Dusun political party, PBS calls itself a "Malaysian multi-racial political party". Members are mostly of Kadazan-Dusun (from both the Dusunic plus Paitanic ethnolinguistic groups) and Murut (including the Lundayeh subgroup) ethnic descent, though the second and third largest ethnic membership are mostly Muslim Bumiputeras, mostly ethnic local Sabahan based ethnic Malay race (Bruneian Malays and Cocos Malays), and also from the Bajau community of peoples (the second-largest ethnic Bumiputera in the state including the Iranun subgroup and some Suluk together with the Chinese, alongside those of mixed-race or "Sino-Native" subgroup of the Chinese minority). Its declared political mission is to strive to safeguard Sabah's autonomy and state rights, promoting democratic principles, economic advancement, human rights and a fair justice system. It also seeks preserving the traditional culture of each race in Sabah and freedom of religion in Malaysia.

Among the most vocal issues voiced by the party were the issue of illegal immigrants along with '''ghost voters in Sabah, the issue of the IC Project in East Malaysia, unbalanced development and the 20 points of the Malaysian Agreement 1963 for Sabah's entry into Malaysia.

Since 1994 major defections from PBS, several political parties with similar ideologies have emerged. The closest one is the STAR Party, founded by Datuk Dr. Jeffrey G. Kitingan, the younger brother of the former president of PBS, Tan Sri Datuk Seri Panglima Joseph Pairin Kitingan. Other similar parties include Parti Bersatu Rakyat Sabah.

 Leadership structure Executive Council
 President:
 Maximus Ongkili
 Deputy President:
 Joachim Gunsalam    
 Yee Moh Chai  
 Jahid Jahim  
 Vice-Presidents:
 Hendrus Anding
 Johnny Mositun
 Daniel Kinsik
 Ruslan Muharam
 Mursid Mohd Said
 Arthur Sen Siong Choo
 Linda Tsen Thau Lin
 Peter Mak
 Women's Wing Chief:
 Malianah Ugau
 Youth Wing Chief:
 Christopher Mandut
 Secretary-General:
 Julita Majungki
 Deputy Secretary-General:
 Johnnybone J. Kurum
 Treasurer-General:
 Lu Kim Yen
 Deputy Treasurer-General:
 Lo Su Fui
 Information Chief:
 Joniston Bangkuai
 Deputy Information Chief:
 Bonaventure Boniface
 Supreme Council Members:
 Peter Jino Allion
 Samuil Mopun
 Fredolin Totin Bangon
 Stanis Buandi
 Suman Yasambun
 William Majimbun
 Masum Bin Takin
 John Chryso Masabal
 Joseph @ Bernard Dalinting
 Muji Bin Ampau
 Hajjah Fazidah Mohd Yassin
 Kasirin Bin Kamiran
 Juin Saman
 Azmi Haji Ahmad
 Omar Hakim
 Zamil Ismail
 Johnny Goh
 Kong Nyuk Thou
 Lim Vun Chan
 Fredian Gan
 Ng Tze Tsai
 Goon Thien Shang
 Joseph Lee
 Divisional Chairpersons:
 N02 Bengkoka: Dr. Samuil Mopun
 N03 Pitas: Awang Okik
 N04 Tanjong Kapor: Martin Majamil
 N05 Matunggong: Julita Mojungki
 N06 Bandau: Maximus Ongkili
 N07 Tandek: Hendrus Anding
 N08 Sulaman: Muji Ampau
 N09 Tempasuk: James Baga
 N10 Usukan: Lamdin Kuyad
 N11 Kadamaian: Demis Rumanti
 N12 Sulaman: Juin Saman
 N13 Pantai Dalit: Lizuan Sarabun
 N14 Tamparuli: Jahid Jahim
 N15 Kiulu: Joniston Bangkuai
 N16 Karambunai: Johnny Goh
 N18 Inanam: Fredoline Totin Bangon
 N19 Likas: Joseph Lee Han Khyun
 N20 Api-Api: Yee Moh Chai
 N21 Luyang: Goon Thien Shang
 N22 Tanjung Aru: Louis Lai Vui Leong
 N23 Petagas: Azmi Hj. Ahmad
 N24 Tanjung Keramat: Tahir Hj. Mohd Soon
 N25 Kapayan: Augustin Anthony
 N26 Moyog: John Chryso Masabal
 N27 Limbahau: Johnny Juani Mositun
 N30 Bongawan: Jitim Abak
 N31 Membakut: Egol Onsim
 N32 Klias: Hamin Gundim
 N33 Kuala Penyu: Sebastian Dirih Anjim
 N34 Lumadan: Ruslan Muharam
 N35 Sindumin: Angian Alai
 N36 Kundasang: Joachim Gunsalam
 N37 Karanaan: Joseph Bernard Dalinting
 N38 Paginatan: Arthur Sen
 N39 Tambunan: Daniel Isidore Stanislaus Kinsik
 N40 Bingkor: Peter Jino Allion
 N41 Liawan: Zachary Robert Stanislaus Kinsik
 N42 Melalap: Martin Johanis
 N43 Kemabong: Raimun Tindil
 N44 Tulid: Suman Yasambun
 N45 Sook: Abraham Akimau
 N46 Nabawan: Likin Simin
 N47 Telupid: Johnnybone Kurum
 N48 Sugut: Jubilee KK Zen
 N49 Labuk: Zamil Ismail
 N50 Gum Gum: Matilda Sapot
 N51 Sungai Manila: Sariah Duling
 N52 Sungai Sibuga: Kasirin Kamiran
 N54 Karamunting: Kong Nyuk Thau
 N55 Elopura: Linda Tsen Thau Lin
 N56 Tanjong Papat: Ong Chih Qun
 N57 Kuamat: Masum Takin
 N60 Tungku: Ayuh Pandasan
 N62 Silam: Haji Mursid Mohd Rais
 N63 Kunak: Hatta Mulok
 N64 Sulabayan: Alibun Gimboh
 N65 Senallang: Omar Hakim
 N66 Bugaya: Hjh Fazidah Hj Mohd Yassin
 N67 Balung: Zakaria Hj Guntik
 N68 Apas: Chong Soo Yin @ Mohd Irwan Chong Abdullah
 N69 Sri Tanjung: Lo Su Fui
 N71 Tanjong Batu: Samson Gapid
 N72 Merotai: A Hasin Nawa
 N73 Sebatik: Sahrol Mahoolop
 P166 Labuan: Peter Mak Chun Vun

Elected representatives

Dewan Negara (Senate)

Dewan Rakyat (House of Representatives)

Members of Parliament of the 15th Malaysian Parliament 

PBS has currently only 1 MP in the House of Representatives.

Dewan Undangan Negeri (State Legislative Assembly)

Malaysian State Assembly Representatives 

Sabah State Legislative Assembly

PBS state governments

Election results

State election results (West Malaysia)

See also 
 Joseph Pairin Kitingan (Former 1st PBS President) 
 Maximus Ongkili (2nd PBS President)

References

Notes 

 James Chin. (1994) "Sabah State Election of 1994: End of Kadazan Unity, Asian Survey, Vol. 34, No. 10, pp. 904–915.

External links 
 

 
Political parties in Sabah
1985 establishments in Malaysia
Political parties established in 1985